Gersprenz is a river that starts in the Odenwald, Hesse and flows into the river Main near Aschaffenburg, Bavaria, Germany.

Tributaries
The tributaries of the Gersprenz (from source to mouth) are as follows:

Left:

Mergbach  (10.9 km)
Bach an dem Seegrund (1.5 km)
Michelbach (3.2 km)
Crumbach (2.3 km)
Bierbach (2.9 km)
Küh-Bach (1 km)
Gräbenackers Bach (2.6 km)
Fischbach (9.7 km)
Schaubach (1.4 km)
Wembach (7.9 km)
Dilsbach (7.9 km)
Hirschbach (5 km)
Erbesbach (9 km)

Right:

Osterbach (7 km)
Steinbach (2.6 km)
Bach an dem Margrund (1 km)
Bach von dem Vierstöck (2.3 km)
Kainsbach (6.1 km)
Affhöllerbach (4.5 km)
Kilsbach (1.8 km)
Brensbach (5.2 km)
Kohlbach (2.3 km)
Brechelser Floß (1.4 km)

See also
List of rivers of Hesse
List of rivers of Bavaria

References

Rivers of Hesse
Rivers of Bavaria
 
Rivers of Germany